The 2014 European Karate Championships, the 49th edition, was held at Tampere in Finland from 1 to 4 May 2014. A total of 481 competitors from 44 countries participated at the event.

Medalists

Men's competition

Individual

Team

Women's competition

Individual

Team

Medal table

Participating countries

References

External links
 Results

2014
International sports competitions hosted by Finland
European Karate Championships
European championships in 2014
Sports competitions in Tampere
Karate competitions in Finland
May 2014 sports events in Europe